Won't Get Fooled Again is an extended play of songs by The Who released in 1988 by Polydor Records.  This EP was only released in the United Kingdom.

Track listing

"Won't Get Fooled Again" (Pete Townshend)
Produced by The Who
Associate producer: Glyn Johns
Recorded at the Rolling Stones Mobile Studio and Olympic Studios, 1971
"Bony Moronie" (Larry Williams)
Produced by John Williams
Recorded at the Rolling Stones Mobile Studio live at the Young Vic, 1971
"Dancing in the Street" (William Stevenson and Marvin Gaye)
Recorded live in Philadelphia, 1979
"Mary Anne with the Shaky Hand" (Townshend)
Produced by Kit Lambert
Recorded at the Talent Masters Studio, 1967

References

1988 EPs
The Who EPs
Albums produced by Kit Lambert
Albums produced by Glyn Johns
Polydor Records EPs